The Sandy Spring Friends Meetinghouse is a historic building located at Sandy Spring, Montgomery County, Maryland. It is a large, Flemish bond brick, Federal-style Quaker Meeting House built in 1817. The meetinghouse is on two acres deeded by James Brooke in the 1750s, for the use of the Quaker Meeting.  Nearby is the cemetery where he and many of his descendants were buried.

In the mid-1900s a community house was built adjacent, "where first day school" classes and "young friends" meet. The weekly meeting (congregation) was also essential in the formation of Sandy Spring Friends School, and Friends House (an assisted living community), both built nearby on Norwood Road.

It was listed on the National Register of Historic Places in 1972.

References

External links
, including photo in 1996, at Maryland Historical Trust website

Quaker meeting houses in Maryland
Churches on the National Register of Historic Places in Maryland
Churches completed in 1817
Churches in Montgomery County, Maryland
National Register of Historic Places in Montgomery County, Maryland